Hypothes.is is a open-source software project that aims to collect comments about statements made in any web-accessible content, and filter and rank those comments to assess each statement's credibility.

It has been summarized as "a peer review layer for the entire Internet."

Concept
The project is a system which allows annotation of web pages, using comments contributed by individuals and a reputation system for rating the comments. The plan is that the comments will be stored in the Internet Archive. Normal use is with a browser plug-in (Chrome) or a bookmarklet (others), and the plan is that links to specific comments will also be viewable without needing a plug-in.

People
The project is led by Dan Whaley, co-founder of GetThere, one of the first online travel booking systems in 1995. Its advisors have included John Perry Barlow, Charles Bazerman, Philip Bourne and Brewster Kahle.

Project
A Kickstarter drive to raise $100,000 to fund a working prototype narrowly reached its goal on November 13, 2011. The effort is organized as a non-profit. It has received financial support from the Shuttleworth Foundation, the Alfred P. Sloan Foundation, the Helmsley Trust, the Knight Foundation and the Andrew W. Mellon Foundation.

In December 2015, Hypothes.is was a founding member of a coalition of scholarly publishers, platforms, libraries, and technology organizations to create an open, interoperable annotation layer over their content.

See also
 Text annotation
 Web annotation

References

External links 
 
 
 
 
 
 
 

Free software projects
Open data
Kickstarter-funded software
Web annotation